Heteroconger congroides is an eel in the family Congridae (conger/garden eels). It was described by Umberto D'Ancona in 1928, originally under the genus Leptocephalus. It is a marine, deepwater-dwelling eel which is known from the Kamaran Islands in Yemen, in the Red Sea, in the western Indian Ocean.

References

congroides
Fish described in 1928